Ian Cameron (born 24 August 1966) is a Scottish former professional footballer who played as a midfielder. He is a first team coach at Partick Thistle and manages the Under-19s, having previously coached their Under-17 team.

Playing career

St Mirren
Cameron was born in Glasgow. He joined St Mirren as an S-Form signing. In 1987, at the age of 21, he was part of the team who won the Scottish Cup after beating Dundee United in the Final. He had sat his economics exams at Glasgow University on the morning of the match.

Aberdeen
Cameron signed for Aberdeen in the summer of 1989 and made his debut against Albion Rovers in a 1989–90 Scottish League Cup tie. Cameron scored the winner against Celtic at Hampden Park in the semi-final of the same tournament, but missed out on playing in the final after suffering concussion in a league game against Hearts, although he did pick up a winner's medal. First team opportunities were limited for him at Aberdeen, and he left in 1992.

Partick Thistle
Manager John Lambie signed Cameron for Partick Thistle on the eve of the 1992–93 season, the club's first campaign back in the Premier Division; he missed just two games, scoring five times from midfield, as Thistle defied predictions to remain in the top tier. At the start of the next campaign he scored four times in a League Cup tie as a record defeat (11–1) was inflicted upon Albion Rovers. He was also part of the sides that stayed up in each of the following two seasons before a dramatic play-off defeat to Dundee United at Tannadice in May 1996 that meant relegation for Thistle. With just 40 seconds remaining it looked as if Cameron's second half penalty would keep his team in the Premier Division for another season, but fate decreed otherwise. He joined Hibernian that summer, but again found playing opportunities limited in his single year at Easter Road.

Later career
Cameron later played for 
Raith Rovers, Clyde, Clydebank and Airdrieonians as well as a brief return to Partick Thistle, before retiring in 2001 aged 35.

Coaching career
Cameron coached Rangers Under-17 before moving to Partick Thistle to take over their Under-17s. He then stepped up to the Thistle Under-19s, winning the SFL League Cup, and then moving into a first team coach position under Ian McCall. He  combines an accountancy career with his coaching work.

Personal life
Cameron has two children, a son named Ian, who had a short spell as a player with Partick Thistle, and is currently a coach in the United States and a daughter named  Kayleigh (Grieve) who was a footballer with Celtic Ladies, Glasgow City and Partick Thistle.

References

External links

1966 births
Living people
Scottish footballers
Footballers from Glasgow
Alumni of the University of Glasgow
Association football midfielders
Aberdeen F.C. players
Airdrieonians F.C. (1878) players
Clyde F.C. players
Clydebank F.C. (1965) players
Hibernian F.C. players
Partick Thistle F.C. players
Raith Rovers F.C. players
Scottish Football League players
St Mirren F.C. players
Rangers F.C. non-playing staff
Partick Thistle F.C. non-playing staff